Brigadier General Samuel Blair Griffith II (May 31, 1906 – March 27, 1983) was an officer and commander in the United States Marine Corps.  Griffith entered the Marines in 1929 after graduating from the United States Naval Academy.  He served in and commanded Marine units in the Pacific theater of World War II and retired from service in 1956.  After his retirement, Griffith wrote several books and numerous articles on military history and lectured widely.  He died on March 27, 1983, in Rhode Island.

Early life through World War II
Griffith was born May 31, 1906, in Lewistown, Pennsylvania. Upon graduation from the U.S. Naval Academy with a B.S. in electrical engineering in 1929, he accepted a commission as a second lieutenant in the United States Marine Corps. Prior to World War II, he took part in the Second Nicaraguan Campaign, and served in China, Cuba, and England. From 1935 to 1938, he studied the Chinese language while attached to the U.S. Embassy in Beijing, where he mastered Chinese.

During World War II, following a period observing British commando training in England and Scotland, he returned to the 1st Marine Division and served as executive officer and later commander of the 1st Marine Raiders Battalion on Guadalcanal, and executive officer of the 1st Raider Regiment in operations on New Georgia. He received the Navy Cross on Guadalcanal in September 1942 for "extreme heroism and courageous devotion to duty" during the fighting near the Matanikau River. During this action, Griffith suffered wounds for which he was awarded the Purple Heart. For his exploits in July in New Georgia, he was awarded the Distinguished Service Cross.

Navy Cross citation
Citation:

The President of the United States of America takes pleasure in presenting the Navy Cross to Lieutenant Colonel Samuel Blair Griffith, II (MCSN: 0–4436), United States Marine Corps, for extraordinary heroism and distinguished service while leading the FIRST Marine Raider Battalion against enemy Japanese forces in the vicinity of Matanikau, Guadalcanal, Solomon Islands, on 27 September 1942. With the only other field officer of the battalion killed that morning, and with his men greatly outnumbered and almost completely surrounded by the enemy, Lieutenant Colonel Griffith moved forward to a position where he could reconnoiter the ground in front of him, in order to effectively employ the troops and weapons under his command. While on this mission, he was painfully wounded by an enemy sniper bullet. Refusing to relinquish command of his troops or leave them without a field officer to control the situation, he returned to his post and personally directed the movements of the battalion throughout the remainder of the afternoon. Later, when relieved by a superior officer, he was finally evacuated to a hospital. By his outstanding leadership, great personal courage, and utter disregard for his own safety in a desperate situation, he maintained the confidence of his subordinate officers and the morale of his troops who fought valorously throughout the remainder of the day. By his dauntless leadership, sustained valor and self-sacrificing devotion to duty under critical combat conditions, Lieutenant Colonel Griffith upheld the highest traditions of the United States Naval Service.

Distinguished Service Cross citation
Citation:

The President of the United States of America, authorized by Act of Congress, July 9, 1918, takes pleasure in presenting the Distinguished Service Cross to Lieutenant Colonel Samuel Blair Griffith, II (MCSN: 0–4436), United States Marine Corps, for extraordinary heroism in connection with military operations against an armed enemy while Commanding the FIRST Marine Raider Battalion in the attack on an enemy shore battery at Enogai Point, New Georgia, Solomon Islands, from 7 to 10 July 1943. Colonel Griffith frequently went alone on reconnaissance through areas covered by enemy fire as he skillfully led his battalion in its advance through swamp and dense jungle toward the objective. Although his men had been without food or water for thirty-six hours, his brilliant leadership and courage infused them with fresh energy to deliver paralyzing blows in the final assault during which four naval guns were seized and 350 of the enemy were killed. The outstanding heroism and skill displayed by Lieutenant Colonel Griffith on this occasion reflect highest credit upon himself and the Armed Forces of the United States.

Post-war career
From 1946 to 1947, he held staff positions in Qingdao, China, giving him a front-row seat to observe the escalating Chinese Civil War. After participating in the post-World War II occupation of North China, where he commanded the 3rd Marine Regiment and later the U.S. Marine Forces in Qingdao, he was a student and then a faculty member at the U.S. Naval War College in Newport from 1947 to 1950. From 1951 to 1952, he was chief of staff, Fleet Marine Force, Atlantic, and from 1953 to 1956, General Griffith was on the staff of the U.S. Commander in Chief, Europe. He retired from the Marine Corps in 1956, after completing more than 25 years of active service.

Post-retirement career
Following his retirement, General Griffith entered Oxford University (New College) and was awarded his D.Phil. in Chinese Military History in 1961. With an interest in China and the Chinese language dating back to pre-World War II days, he translated Mao Zedong's On Guerrilla War in 1961 and Sun Tzu's The Art of War in 1963.  The latter is much more than a mere translation. It incorporates numerous ancient Chinese commentaries on "The Art of War," and also culls a variety of ancient sources for the chapters on Sun Tzu's biography, the evolution of the text, the Warring States period, ancient warfare, and a comparison with Mao Zedong's military thought.   The word choice is perhaps evocative of both the hard work of translation and of the author's experiences at Guadalcanal and New Georgia. Other translators of Sun Tzu lack the insights derived from Griffith's long military experience.

Griffith also wrote the definitive The Battle for Guadalcanal, The Chinese People's Liberation Army, and, his last major work, In Defense of the Public Liberty, a book concerned with the Revolutionary War. He was a research fellow, China Study, at the Council on Foreign Relations and a member of the Institute for Defense Studies in London. General Griffith published widely in such journals as The New Yorker, Saturday Evening Post, U.S. Naval Institute Proceedings, Town & Country, Marine Corps Gazette, and Foreign Affairs. He has also lectured widely at such establishments as the Armed Forces Staff College, United States Military Academy, Foreign Policy Association, and Marine Corps Schools. General Griffith was a life member of the 1st Marine Raider Association and the 1st Marine Division Association.  He died unexpectedly  on March 27, 1983, in Newport, Rhode Island.

See also

Works

Notes

References

Books

Web

1906 births
1983 deaths
United States Marine Corps personnel of World War II
American military personnel of the Banana Wars
Recipients of the Navy Cross (United States)
People from Lewistown, Pennsylvania
Recipients of the Distinguished Service Cross (United States)
United States Marine Corps generals
Marine Raiders
Military personnel from Pennsylvania